The mixed team judo event at the 2019 European Games in Minsk, serving as the European Mixed Team Judo Championships, was held on 25 June at the Čyžoŭka-Arena.

Results

Repechage

References

External links
 
 Results
 Medallists

Team
EU 2019
2019